The Old Taylor County Jail  is a historic jail in Perry, Florida, located on the 400 block of North Washington Street.  It was built in 1912 and was listed on the National Register of Historic Places in 1989.

It was deemed significant as the oldest surviving building in Taylor County, Florida and for its close association with John Henry Parker, the longest serving sheriff of the county.

"It was also deemed significant "as one of the few remaining jail-sheriff's residences remaining in Florida" and as an example of the work of Benjamin Bosworth Smith, a prominent architect in the Southeast in the early twentieth century, and as an example of the early twentieth century use of reinforced concrete."

Benjamin Bosworth Smith had designed the Taylor County Courthouse a few years earlier.

References

External links
 Florida's Office of Cultural and Historical Programs
 Taylor County listings
 Old Taylor County Jail

Buildings and structures in Taylor County, Florida
Jails in Florida
Vernacular architecture in Florida
National Register of Historic Places in Taylor County, Florida
Jails on the National Register of Historic Places in Florida